The 2022 Vuelta a España was a three-week cycling race which took place in the Netherlands and Spain between 19 August and 11 September 2022. It was the 77th edition of the Vuelta a España and the third and final grand tour of the 2022 men's road cycling season. The race started in Utrecht and finished in Madrid. In the third stage, the route briefly passed through Baarle-Hertog, in Belgium.

The race was won by Belgium's Remco Evenepoel which was his first Grand Tour triumph.

Teams 

Twenty-three teams participated in the 2022 Vuelta a España. All eighteen UCI WorldTeams were obliged to participate.

UCI WorldTeams

 
 
 
 
 
 
 
 
 
 
 
 
 
 
 
 
 
 

UCI ProTeams

Route and stages

Classification leadership

Classification standings

General classification

Points classification

Mountains classification

Young rider classification

Team classification

References

External links 
 

2022
 
2022 UCI World Tour
2022 in Dutch sport
2022 in Spanish sport
2022 in road cycling
Vuelta
Vuelta
Vuelta